Pierre-Narcisse, baron Guérin (13 March 1774 – 6 July 1833) was a French painter born in Paris.

Background
A pupil of Jean-Baptiste Regnault, he carried off one of the three grands prix offered in 1796, in consequence of the competition not having taken place since 1793. In 1799, his painting Marcus Sextus (Louvre) was exhibited at the Salon and excited wild enthusiasm.  Part of this was due to the subject – a victim of Sulla's proscription returning to Rome to find his wife dead and his house in mourning – in which an allusion was found to the turmoil of the French Revolution.

Guérin on this occasion was publicly crowned by the president of the Institute, and went to Rome to study under Joseph-Benoît Suvée.  In 1800, unable to remain in Rome on account of his health, he went to Naples, where he painted The Shepherds in the Tomb of Amyntas . In 1802 Guérin produced Phaedra and Hippolytus (Louvre); in 1810, after his return to Paris, he again achieved a great success with Andromache and Pyrrhus (Louvre); and in the same year also exhibited Aurora and Cephalus (Pushkin Museum) and Bonaparte and the Rebels of Cairo (Versailles).  These paintings suited the popular taste of the First Empire, being highly melodramatic and pompously dignified.

The Restoration brought to Guérin fresh honours; he had received from the first consul in 1803 the cross of the Legion of Honour, and in 1815 Louis XVIII named to the Académie des Beaux-Arts. His style changed to accord with popular taste.  In Aeneas Relating to Dido the Disasters of Troy (Louvre), Guérin adopted a more sensuous, picturesque style.

Guérin was commissioned to paint for the Madeleine a scene from the history of St Louis, but his health prevented him from accomplishing what he had begun, and in 1822 he accepted the post of director of the French Academy in Rome, which in 1816 he had refused. On returning to Paris in 1828, Guérin, who had previously been made chevalier of the order of St. Michel, was ennobled. He now attempted to complete Pyrrhus and Priam, a work which he had begun at Rome, but in vain; his health had finally broken down, and in the hope of improvement he returned to Italy with Horace Vernet. Shortly after his arrival at Rome Baron Guérin died, on 6 July 1833, and was buried in the church of La Trinité de Monti by the side of Claude Lorrain.

A heroic portrait by Guerin hangs in the Basilica of the National Shrine of the Assumption of the Blessed Virgin Mary in Baltimore.  An 1821 gift of King Louis XVIII of France, it depicts the Descent from the Cross.

Pupils
Many artists studied with Guérin, among them Eugène Delacroix, Théodore Géricault, Ary and Hendrik Scheffer.

References

External links 
 
 

1774 births
1833 deaths
Painters from Paris
Barons of France
Members of the Académie des beaux-arts
18th-century French painters
French male painters
19th-century French painters
Prix de Rome for painting
19th-century French male artists
18th-century French male artists